Indian actor Irrfan Khan (1967–2020) had an extensive career in Indian and British-American cinema. His film debut was a minor role in Mira Nair's Salaam Bombay! in 1988. He followed this with appearances in a variety of television shows in the late 1980s to 1990s including playing ʽAbd al-Qadir Badayuni in Bharat Ek Khoj (1988), Makhdoom Mohiuddin in Kahkashan (1991), Vladimir Lenin in Lal Ghas Per Neele Ghodey (1992), a dual role in Chandrakanta (1994), and Valmiki in Jai Hanuman (1997). Khan found his television work unfulfilling and considered quitting acting. 

His career experienced a turnaround with his breakthrough role as the lead in Asif Kapadia's The Warrior (2001), which won the BAFTA Award for Outstanding British Film. He followed this with critically acclaimed villainous roles in Haasil and Maqbool (both in 2003). For the former performance, where he played a devious politician, Khan received the Filmfare Award for Best Performance in a Negative Role. In 2006, Khan portrayed a first-generation Bengali immigrant in the Mira Nair-directed film The Namesake with Tabu and a hitman in The Killer. The following year, he won the Filmfare Award for Best Supporting Actor for his performance as a 38-year-old man waiting to marry the right woman in Anurag Basu-directed Life in a... Metro. In 2008, he received international recognition for his role as a police inspector in Danny Boyle's Slumdog Millionaire (2008), which won the Academy Award for Best Picture.

Khan played the eponymous athlete-turned-bandit in Paan Singh Tomar and the adult version of the title character in Ang Lee's Life of Pi (both in 2012). For the former, he won the National Film Award for Best Actor, the latter was critically acclaimed and was a commercial success. In 2013, he portrayed a widower who pursues an epistolary romance with a married woman in The Lunchbox with Nimrat Kaur. The film, which he also produced, was a commercial success and received critical acclaim. Three years later, he played supporting roles in Haider, Jurassic World, and Piku. In 2016, he played jurist Radhabinod Pal in the television miniseries Tokyo Trial. In 2017, his performance as a father trying to get a place for his daughter in an elite English-medium school in Hindi Medium garnered him the Filmfare Award for Best Actor and also became his highest-grossing Hindi release. Khan starred as a widower in Angrezi Medium (2020) and again won the Filmfare Award for Best Actor. It was to be his final role as he died later in the same year, aged 53. He was posthumously awarded the 2021 Filmfare Lifetime Achievement Award.

Film

Television

References

External links
 

Indian filmographies
Male actor filmographies